Vasyl Kobin (born 24 May 1985) is a retired Ukrainian football midfielder and former manager of FC Mynai.

Career
He played for the club Zakarpattia Uzhhorod before joining Karpaty Lviv. On 19 June 2009 Shakhtar Donetsk officially signed the right wingback from Karpaty Lviv, he left Lviv after three seasons with 131 appearances and 11 goals in the league.

On 7 February 2018, Kobin signed for FC Tobol. Kobin played 9 games for Tobol before being released by mutual agreement on 30 June 2018.

Statistic

International

Honours
Zakarpattya Uzhhorod
 Ukrainian First League: 2003–04

Shakhtar Donetsk (16)
 Ukrainian Premier League (6): 2009–10, 2010–11, 2011–12, 2012–13, 2013–14, 2016–17
 Ukrainian Cup (5): 2010–11, 2011–12, 2012–13, 2015–16, 2016–17
 Ukrainian Super Cup (5): 2010, 2012, 2013, 2014, 2015

References

External links
 
 
Profile on the Karpaty Lviv Official Website 

1985 births
Living people
Ukrainian footballers
Ukraine international footballers
Ukraine under-21 international footballers
Ukrainian people of Hungarian descent
FC Karpaty Lviv players
FC Hoverla Uzhhorod players
FC Shakhtar Donetsk players
Ukrainian Premier League players
Ukrainian First League players
Ukrainian Second League players
FC Metalist Kharkiv players
FC Shakhtyor Soligorsk players
NK Veres Rivne players
FC Tobol players
FC Mynai players
Ukrainian expatriate footballers
Expatriate footballers in Belarus
Ukrainian expatriate sportspeople in Belarus
Expatriate footballers in Kazakhstan
Ukrainian expatriate sportspeople in Kazakhstan
Association football midfielders
FC Mynai managers
Ukrainian Premier League managers
Ukrainian football managers
Sportspeople from Zakarpattia Oblast